Massively Parallel Quantum Chemistry (MPQC) is an ab initio computational chemistry software program. Three features distinguish it from other quantum chemistry programs such as Gaussian and GAMESS: it is open-source, has an object-oriented design, and is created from the beginning as a parallel processing program. It is available in Ubuntu and Debian.

MPQC provides implementations for a number of important methods for calculating electronic structure, including Hartree–Fock, Møller–Plesset perturbation theory (including its explicitly correlated linear R12 versions), and density functional theory.

See also

 List of quantum chemistry and solid state physics software

References

External links
 MPQC Homepage

Computational chemistry software
Free software programmed in C++
Free chemistry software
Chemistry software for Linux